Antennablennius australis, the moustached blenny, is a species of combtooth blenny found in the western Indian Ocean.

References

australis
Fish described in 1951
Taxa named by Alec Fraser-Brunner